Freyr Alexandersson (born 18 November 1982) is an Icelandic football coach and former player who is currently the manager of the Danish Superliga club Lyngby Boldklub. He was manager of the Icelandic women's national football team from 2013 to 2018.

Playing career
Freyr came up through the junior ranks of Leiknir Reykjavík where he played 81 league and cup matches.

Managing career
Freyr started his coaching career as a girls youth team coach at Leiknir Reykjavík. In 2006 he started as a youth coach for girls at Valur.

Valur women's and men's team 
Freyr assisted Valur women's team mananger Elísabet Gunnarsdóttir in the summer of 2007 and in September that year Freyr decided to retire from playing football and became joint manager of Valur women's team alongside Elísabet. Freyr and Elísabet won the Úrvalsdeild kvenna in 2008 and after that season Elísabet departed to Sweden and Freyr took over as manager. The next two years Freyr would win the Úrvaldeild two times and also the Icelandic Women's Football Cup two times. After his time at Valur women's Freyr served an assistant manager for Valur men's team for two seasons.

Leiknir Reykjavík 
After having appeared for the club as a player Freyr returned to Leiknir for the 2013 season, this time as joint manager of the 1.deild karla team, alongside Davíð Snorri Jónasson. In their first season Leiknir finished in 7th place. In his second season as joint manager Freyr managed to steer Leiknir to promotion to the first tier of Icelandic football for the first time in Leiknir's 41 year old history. Winning the 1.deild karla with 48 points. In their first-ever Úrvaldeild karla match on 3 May 2015, Leiknir defeated Valur 3–0 at Hlíðarendi. However they could not manage to keep Leiknir in the Úrvalsdeild and were relegated at the end of the season. In the last game of the season Freyr and Davíð announced that they would not return for the next season.

Icelandic women's national team
In September 2013, Freyr was appointed manager of the Icelandic women's national football team, combining the role with his existing job at 1. deild karla club Leiknir Reykjavík.

With Margrét Lára Viðarsdóttir on maternity leave, Freyr appointed Sara Björk Gunnarsdóttir as Iceland's new team captain in January 2014.

On 4 September 2018 he announced that he was stepping down as manager of the team after it failed to make the 2019 FIFA Women's World Cup.

Icelandic men's national team
Freyr served as a game analyst for the Icelandic men's national football team during the 2018 World Cup. On 8 August 2018, Freyr was appointed as assistant manager to the new Icelandic national football team manager Erik Hamrén on a two-year contract.

Lyngby Boldklub
In June 2021 he became the new manager of the Danish 1st Division club Lyngby Boldklub. With Frey as manager Lyngby Boldklub finished as runner up of the season, earning the club a promotion to the top level in Danish football, Superligaen.

Honours

As manager
Valur women's
 Úrvalsdeild kvenna: 2008, 2009, 2010
 Icelandic Women's Football Cup: 2009, 2010

Leiknir R.
 1. deild karla: 2014

As player
Leiknir R.
 2. deild karla: 2005

References

External links

1982 births
Living people
Freyr Alexandersson
Freyr Alexandersson
Freyr Alexandersson
Freyr Alexandersson
Freyr Alexandersson
Association football defenders
Freyr Alexandersson
Danish 1st Division managers
Lyngby Boldklub managers